Sverker II or Sverker the Younger (Swedish: Sverker den yngre or Sverker Karlsson, born before 1167 – 17 July 1210) was King of Sweden from 1195 or 1196 to 1208 when he was defeated in the Battle of Lena by Prince Eric. Sverker died in the 1210 Battle of Gestilren where his forces battled those of King Eric X.

Early life
Sverker was a son of King Karl Sverkersson of Sweden and Queen Christine Stigsdatter of Hvide, a Danish noblewoman. Through his mother, he was a cousin's son of the Danish kings Canute VI and Valdemar Sejr. His parents' marriage has been dated to 1162 or more probably 1163.

When his father Karl had been murdered in Visingsö in 1167, apparently by minions of the next king Canute I of Sweden, Sverker was taken to Denmark while a  boy and grew up with his mother's clan of Hvide, leaders of Zealand. Sverker also allied himself with the Galen clan leaders in Skåne who were close to the Hvide, by marriage through lady Benedikte Ebbesdotter of Hvide. The Danish king supported him as claimant to Sweden, thus helping to destabilize the neighboring country. The troubled Danish-Swedish relations at this time can be seen from attempts by Canute I and his jarl Birger Brosa to support rebels against Valdemar I and Canute VI.

When King Canute I of Sweden died in 1195 or 1196, his sons were young but not children. One of them had been appointed heir to the throne, but was passed over. Sverker was chosen as the next king of Sweden, surprisingly without quarrel. At some point he had returned to his native country, however being regarded quite Danish. His uncontested election probably owed much to Jarl Birger Brosa whose daughter, Ingegerd Birgersdotter of Bjelbo, Sverker married soon after his first wife had died. In his own letters he emphasized his birth-right to kingship: "son of King Charles, King of the Swedes, possessor of the throne of the same kingdom according to hereditary right by the grace of God".

Reign

King Sverker confirmed and enlarged privileges for the Swedish church and Valerius, the Archbishop of Uppsala. The privilege document of 1200 is the oldest known ecclesiastical privilege in Sweden. Skáldatal names two of Sverker's court skalds: Sumarliði skáld and Þorgeirr Danaskáld. In 1202 Earl Birger died and the late jarl's grandson, Sverker's one-year-old son John received the title of Jarl from his father. This was intended to strengthen him as heir of the crown, but led to much ridicule.

Desultory warfare with the peoples east of the Baltic Sea continued during Sverker's reign. Birger Brosa undertook a sea-borne expedition that ended up in Wierland in eastern Estonia, either before or after Sverker's accession. A late and unreliable source indicates that troops from the Novgorod Republic attacked Finland in 1198 and ravaged Åbo where the Swedes already supposedly possessed an outpost. This may be an elaboration of another Russian attack in 1191, and Åbo did not yet exist as a settlement. A certain Dux John (Johannes) flourished in the early 13th century; according his grave inscription, he was the "terror of the pagans". He may be identified with a John Jarl who, according to later tradition, fought the Russians and Ingrians for nine years, but was killed at Askanäs by Lake Mälaren by Karelian pirates, immediately after his return. His widow supposedly gathered levies which killed the marauders at Estaskär. It has been suggested that this took place in 1206. In general, Estonian and Curonian raiders constituted a problem for the coasts of Sweden and Denmark in this era.

Civil war
Around 1203, Canute's four sons, who had lived in Swedish royal court, began to claim the throne and Sverker exiled them to Norway. His position as king became insecure from this point forward. The sons of Canute returned with troops in 1205, supported by the Norwegian party of Birkebeiner. Sverker, however, attacked and defeated them in the Battle of Älgarås in Tiveden, where three of the sons fell. The only survivor, Eric, returned with Norwegian support in 1208. Sverker sought assistance from his Danish kinsmen, and such was provided. Popular tradition speaks of 12,000 Danish auxiliary troops, which is likely a gross exaggeration. The forces were commanded by Ebbe Sunesen, the father of his late first wife and brother of Andreas Sunesen, Archbishop of Lund. Apart from the forces of the Sunesen brothers, King Valdemar Sejr contributed with troops, even including Bohemian soldiers. The opponents met in the Battle of Lena in Västergötland, where Sverker was heavily defeated.  Ebbe and his brother Lars were slain by the enemy together with a considerable part of their army. Sverker's jarl Knut seems to have been killed as well. King Eric X of Sweden drove Sverker to exile to Denmark.

Death
Pope Innocentius III's attempt to have the crown returned to Sverker did not succeed. Sverker made a new military expedition, with Danish support, to Sweden, but was defeated and killed in the Battle of Gestilren in July 1210. The ancient sources state that "the Folkung [party] took his life". Responsible for the killing was his brother-in-law Folke Jarl, head of the Folkungs, who also succumbed in the battle. The site of the battle has engendered some discussion; while it is usually taken to have taken place in the parish of Varv in Västergötland, Gästre in Uppland has also been suggested.

In spite of his hapless fate, Sverker II receives several kind words in the short chronicle included in the Law of Västergötland: "The sixteenth [ruler] was King Sverker, a wise and good fellow; the kingdom fared well from him. But the Folkungs took his life; his own brother-in-law did that to him at Gestilren. He rests in Alvastra, and the best things are always spoken about him".

Family
With his first wife, the Danish noble Benedicta Ebbesdatter (Galen branch of the Hvide family), b. , d. 1200), whom he married before 1190 when yet living in Denmark, Sverker had at least one well-attested daughter, Helena Sverkersdotter. There were possibly further children, such as Karl Sverkersson who according to Norwegian sources married a daughter of king Sverre of Norway and lost his life in 1198; his position is however doubtful, and if he was King Sverker's son he died in adolescence at the latest. There were possibly even two other daughters, Margaret and Christina, married to Witzlav of Rügen and Henry II, Lord of Mecklenburg ("Henry Borwin" in some later texts), respectively. The genealogical reconstruction is based on vague contemporary statements – however, Margaret and Christina may just have been Sverker's first wife's kinswomen.

The second marriage in 1200 with Ingegerd Birgersdotter of Bjelbo, daughter of the Folkunge Jarl Birger Brosa, produced a son and heir, Jon (1201–1222), who was chosen king of Sweden 1216 as John I of Sweden.

It has also been argued however that it is possible Ingegerd Birgersdotter was in fact Sverker's first wife, and Benedicta Ebeesdatter his second, and that possibly more of the evidence may point to this conclusion instead.

His attested daughter Helena Sverkersdotter married (earl) Sune Folkason of the family of Bjelbo, justiciar of Västergötland. Their daughters Catherine of Ymseborg and Benedicta of Bjelbo became pawns in marriages to gain Swedish succession after 1222, when the Sverker dynasty became extinct in male line. Catherine was married to the rival dynasty's heir Eric XI of Sweden but they remained apparently childless. Benedikte married Svantepolk of Viby and had several daughters, who married Swedish noblemen. Several Swedish noble families claim descent from Benedikte.

References

Literature
 
 
 
 
 , häfte 1, 1981
 Harrison, Dick, Sveriges historia; medeltiden. Stockholm: Liber, 2002.
 Lönnroth, Erik, Från svensk medeltid. Stockholm: Aldus, 1959.
 Munch, P.A., Det norske Folks Historie, Vol. III. Christiania: Chr. Tönsbergs Forlag, 1857.
 Sandblom, Sven, Gestilren 1210. Striden stod i Uppland! I Gästre!. Enköping: Enköpings kommun, 2004.
 Sundberg, Ulf, Medeltidens svenska krig. Stockholm: Hjalmarson & Högberg, 1999.

Further reading
Lindström, Fredrik; Lindström, Henrik Svitjods undergång och Sveriges födelse  (Albert Bonniers Förlag AB. 2006)
Lagerqvist, Lars O. Sverige och dess regenter under 1.000 år (Albert Bonniers Förlag AB. 1982)

External links
  

1160s births
1210 deaths
12th-century Swedish monarchs
13th-century Swedish monarchs
Rulers of Finland
Monarchs killed in action
Sons of kings
Swedish military personnel killed in action